The Portuguese Independent Heavy Artillery Corps (Corpo de Artilharia Pesada Indepedente in Portuguese, Corps d'artillerie lourde portugais in French), or the CAPI, was a Portuguese railway heavy artillery unit that operated on the Western Front, during World War I. 

The CAPI was created in response to a request from France for artillery support. It was independent from the much larger and better known Portuguese Expeditionary Corps, which also fought on the Western Front. The unit operated , 240-mm and 190-mm railway guns, which were supplied by Britain, and operated under the control of the French Army. Most of the CAPI's personnel came from the Portuguese Army foot artillery branch, which in Portugal was responsible for manning the heavy guns of the coastal and garrison batteries. Other personnel came from the naval artillery.

Organization
The CAPI was made up of:
 Headquarters and staff;
 Three mixed groups (battalions);
 Depot battery.

Each group consisted of three batteries, one of 320-mm guns, while the other two were equipped with either 190-mm or 240-mm guns.

See also
 Portugal in World War I

References

External links
 Corpo de Artilharia Pesada Independente, Momentos da História

Army units and formations of Portugal
Corps of World War I
Military units and formations of Portugal in World War I